The Houses in Between is a 1951 novel by the British writer Howard Spring. It follows the life of one character Sarah Rainborough from 1851 to 1948. At the beginning of the story she is taken by her family to see The Crystal Palace in London as part of the Great Exhibition.

The title refers to a traditional music hall song that you would be able to see to Crystal Palace if it weren't for the houses in between. Much of the novel is set in Cornwall, where Spring lived and used as the setting for many of his later works. In America it reached the Publishers Weekly annual list of bestselling novels for 1953.

References

Bibliography
 Merriam-Webster's Encyclopedia of Literature. Merriam-Webster, 1995.

1951 British novels
Novels by Howard Spring
Novels set in Cornwall
Novels set in London
Novels set in the 19th century
Novels set in the 20th century
William Collins, Sons books